The Secretary of Defense Meritorious Civilian Service Award is the second highest career award presented by the Department of Defense.  It is presented for exceptionally noteworthy service of major significance to the Department of Defense as a whole.

Award procedure
Candidates for this award are Department of Defense or other government agency employees who have rendered exceptionally meritorious service of major significance to the Department of Defense.  This award requires review by the Department of Defense Incentive Awards Board.  This board recommends approval or disapproval of the award, though the Secretary of Defense is the approval authority.  Heads of the Office of the Secretary of Defense Components and Secretaries of Military Departments submit nominations to the Assistant Director for Labor and Management Employee Relations, Directorate for Personnel and Security, Washington Headquarters Services.

Award device
Recipients of the award receive a medal set, a certificate signed by the Secretary of Defense and citation.  Recipients may receive the award more than once, with subsequent awards being recognized by bronze, silver, or gold palms.

See also
Awards and decorations of the United States government

References

Awards and decorations of the United States Department of Defense